Odites argyrophanes is a moth in the family Depressariidae. It was described by Edward Meyrick in 1937. It is found in South Africa, where it has been recorded from KwaZulu-Natal.

References

Endemic moths of South Africa
Moths described in 1937
Odites
Taxa named by Edward Meyrick